Stefan Förster (born 17 October 1950) is a German boxer. He competed at the 1972 Summer Olympics and the 1976 Summer Olympics for East Germany. At the 1972 Summer Olympics, he defeated Les Hamilton and Mayaki Seydou, before losing to Alfonso Zamora.

References

External links
 

1950 births
Living people
German male boxers
Olympic boxers of East Germany
Boxers at the 1972 Summer Olympics
Boxers at the 1976 Summer Olympics
Sportspeople from Chemnitz
AIBA World Boxing Championships medalists
Bantamweight boxers